Dougoutene I  is a commune of the Cercle of Koro in the Mopti Region of Mali. The commune contains 20 villages and in the 2009 census had a population of 21,753. The commune is administered from the village of Toroli.

Some typical cultivated plants are millet, sesame and rice.

References

Communes of Mopti Region